Stanhopea cirrhata is a species of orchid endemic to Central America (Costa Rica, Honduras, Nicaragua and Panama).

References

External links 

cirrhata
Orchids of Costa Rica
Orchids of Honduras
Orchids of Nicaragua
Orchids of Panama